The Ratelband List (in Dutch,  Lijst Ratelband ) was a political movement led by the self-help guru Emile Ratelband. Ratelband set up his own list after being rejected as lijsttrekker for Leefbaar Nederland; his daughter Minou had also had a prominent place in the list. The political programme of the Ratelband List was essentially in the spirit of Pim Fortuyn. The Ratelband List took part in the elections for the Tweede Kamer on 22 January 2003. Before the elections Ratelband asserted that he would move to Australia or the Fiji Islands if the list failed to win a single seat.

In spite of the great familiarity of Emile Ratelband in the Netherlands, the consequent media attention, and the fact that the movement stood in all 19 electoral districts ("kieskringen"), it received 9,023 votes (0,1%), far from enough to win even a single seat. According to the site Lijstratelband.nl he remained in the Netherlands at the request of this website, demonstrating that "democracy in our movement counts for more than his own position".

Since the elections of January 2003 little or nothing has been heard from the Ratelband List.

References

Defunct political parties in the Netherlands